The Cape Breton Post is the only daily newspaper published on Cape Breton Island. Based in Sydney, Nova Scotia, it specializes in local coverage of news, events, and sports from communities in the Cape Breton Regional Municipality and the counties of Inverness, Richmond and Victoria.

On April 13, 2017, Transcontinental announced that it had sold all of its newspapers in Atlantic Canada to SaltWire Network, a newly formed parent company of The Chronicle Herald.

See also
List of newspapers in Canada

References

External links
Official website

Mass media in the Cape Breton Regional Municipality
SaltWire Network publications
Daily newspapers published in Nova Scotia
Publications with year of establishment missing